'Brompton Caribou' is 28 feet 6 inches long, 7 feet 6 inches wide and has a depth of 2 feet 9 inches boat commonly known as a "Gator Tug", or "Winch boat" made by the Russel-Hipwell Engines Company in 1955 and is hull number 1058. It is made with a welded 3/16" steel hull in the clinker configuration and a cabin made of 18 gauge steel. It has a cable steering system with a plate steel rudder, 26" diameter Propeller with a rather heavy duty shield around the prop made of round bar to shop logs and debris from damaging the propeller, English made Lister model FR4 4 cylinder water-cooled diesel engine producing 36 hp at 1,800 rpm and a Twin Disc model MG-61 reversing marine gearbox with a 3:1 gear ratio. This boat also originally had a Russel-Hipweel winch, model W-434 that was driven by a PTO on the front of the engine but it has since been removed. The standard models have a simple rectangle cabin with a large sliding windows on both the port and starboard sides, a smaller sliding window and a door that opens to the inside on the front, and a little sliding door on the back of the cabin. They usually have the exhaust pipe going out through the side of the hull approximately a foot below the bulwarks on an angle facing aft, but many have had the pipe removed and installed going up through the roof of the cabin.

There is a cable sheave on each side of the boat by the corners of the cabin up forward on the edge of the bulwarks, 2 at the bow on the inside of the bulwarks, and one larger one right on the bow of the boats, all for the cable to roll on while using the winch. The boats usually also have the hull number on the bow under the larger roller. There is a cleat welded on the inside of the bulwarks on each side up foreword for tying the boat to a dock, and the double bitt on the stern just aft of the cabin for hooking up log booms and tying the boat up as well. The winches on these boats usually carried between 1500–2000 feet of 7/16 steel cable.

More history and info about these types of boats

This vessel has a closed circuit cooling system, with a sealed tank built on the starboard (right) side of the hull which holds approximately 40-50 litres of water. This system was used as these boats would be used for bundling up logs in shallow water, and can also portage themselves over land using their own winch, so to keep the engines cooled they had to have their own cooling system on board that wouldn't "run dry".

The boats were built to be operated by one person standing inside on the port side beside the engine, the steering wheel was mounted on a frame along the side so the person can operate the throttle for the engine, the lever for shifting the gearbox, and the lever for operating the winch all on their right side, and steer the boat by turning the wheel with their left hand.

These boats had a 175lb anchor on the bow hooked up the cable on the winch, when these boats were used for logging, they would go a distance ahead of the log boom, drop the anchor and pay out the winch while backing up to the log boom, hook up the boom to a set of double bitts (H-bitt) at the stern of the boat (just aft of the cabin) and haul the logs foreword using the propeller and by engaging the winch to pull them along. The way these vessels were made if fantastic, they are small and light, but has much torque for pulling.

There were hundreds of these little boats built by the Russel Brothers company and many can be found scattered all across Canada, and a few, in the United States. This series of winch boat was made usually in sizes ranging from 20 feet long to about 30 feet long, and had an option of a few different engines including Russel Gas engines (originally Campbell Gasoline Engines but in 1923 Russel Brothers purchased rights to manufacture the engines), Sheppard Diesel Engines, and later Lister Diesel engine. Over the years many boats have been re powered by their owners with other engine including Perkins, Detroit Diesel, Caterpillar, and other diesel engines. They usually had two fuel tanks, one under the deck in the bow, and one under the stern deck just behind the engine, the one that is on my boat appears to be approximately 120-litre tank, and it is a heavy wall steel drum type tank.

Over the years since the log drives have stopped, many of these boats have been converted into pleasure boats and general small tugboat, usually with new or modified cabins installed.

References

Merchant ships of Canada
Tugboats of Canada